Castle Acre is a village and civil parish in the English county of Norfolk.

History
Castle Acre's name is of Anglo-Saxon and Norman origin and derives from the Old English and Norman French for a castle close to cultivated land. 

The village is most famous for being the location of Castle Acre Castle which was built in 1085 by William de Warenne in order to enforce his control over his East Anglian lands. By the Twelfth Century, the castle passed into the ownership of Hamelin Plantagenet who hosted both King Henry II and King Edward I in Castle Acre. By the Sixteenth Century, the castle lay mainly derelict yet had a procession of illustrious owners including Thomas Howard, Thomas Cecil and Sir Edward Coke. Today, the castle is maintained by English Heritage.

Furthermore, Castle Acre is home to the ruins of Castle Acre Priory which was established in 1090 by William de Warenne for an order of Cluniac monks. The monastery fell into disrepair after Dissolution of the monasteries in the Sixteenth Century. Today, the priory is maintained by English Heritage.

Geography
In the 2011 census, Castle Acre was reported as having a population of 848 residents in 463 households.

Castle Acre is located in the King's Lynn and West Norfolk District and is part of the North West Norfolk constituency and is thus represented by James Wild MP in Parliament.

St. James' Church
Castle Acre's Parish Church is of Norman origin and is dedicated to Saint James. The church was heavily restored in the Fourteenth Century with further work being completed in the Nineteenth Century by Ewan Christian.

Notable Residents
 William de Warenne, 1st Earl of Surrey- Norman nobleman
 Gundred, Countess of Surrey- Flemish noblewoman
 William de Warenne, 2nd Earl of Surrey- Anglo-Norman nobleman
 Elizabeth of Vermandois, Countess of Leicester- French noblewoman
 William de Warenne, 3rd Earl of Surrey- Anglo-Norman nobleman
 Isabel de Warenne, Countess of Surrey- English noblewoman
 William de Warenne, 5th Earl of Surrey- English nobleman
 John de Warenne, 6th Earl of Surrey- English nobleman
 William de Warenne- English nobleman
 Thomas Howard, 4th Duke of Norfolk- English nobleman and politician
 Thomas Cecil, 1st Earl of Exeter- English politician, courtier and soldier
 Edward Coke- English barrister, judge and politician

War Memorial

References

External links

Villages in Norfolk
King's Lynn and West Norfolk
Civil parishes in Norfolk